Leopold Hoffman Cohn (September 12, 1862, Berezna, Hungary - December 19, 1937, Brooklyn, NY) was a Jewish convert to Evangelicalism who formed the Brownsville Mission to the Jews, an organization that now exists as Chosen People Ministries.  Cohn lived in Hungary, and, shortly after his arrival to the United States, converted to Evangelicalism. He was ordained a Baptist minister. In his day, he was one of the most successful and controversial Christian evangelists to the Jews.  In 1930, Cohn was awarded an honorary degree of Doctor of Divinity by Wheaton College, an Evangellical college.

Cohn states in his autobiography that he was ordained as a rabbi in his native Hungary in the 1880s, though Jews doubted this claim. Yaakov Shalom Ariel, professor of religious studies at the University of North Carolina at Chapel Hill, writes that "there could be little doubt that he was well read in rabbinical literature and had acquired, after his conversion to Christianity, a good knowledge of Christian theology as well." Even his name was contested: Rabbi David Max Eichhorn writes that "As early as October 13, 1893, Adolph Benjamin wrote in the Hebrew Standard that Cohn's real name was Itsak Leib Joszovics". In a 1913 court case, a number of people claiming to be Cohn's relatives and friends stated that Cohn was in fact Joszovics, a saloonkeeper who had been arrested and sentenced for fraud in Hungary in 1891, and that he left Hungary to avoid serving a two and a half years sentence, leaving behind his wife and children.  The relationship between Cohn and his detractors was acrimonious, resulting in several lawsuits and counter-complaints. Cohn denied the accusations and the court refused to act upon the charge.

References

1862 births
1937 deaths
19th-century evangelicals
19th-century Jews
20th-century evangelicals
Austro-Hungarian emigrants to the United States
Austro-Hungarian Jews
American evangelicals
Converts to Christianity from Judaism
Messianic clergy